WPEP ( AM) was an AM radio station licensed to Taunton, Massachusetts. WPEP's format had been full-service, offering local news and talk programming, as well as music and nationally syndicated talk. The station was last owned by the Anastos Media Group.

History

1940s
In late , Silver City Broadcasting Corp., owned by businessman John McGregor, applied for and was granted a construction permit for an AM broadcast station in Taunton. The station's callsign was originally to be WTRN, however the callsign was changed to WPEP before the station officially signed on the air December 22, 1949. When WPEP signed on, its studio was located atop the Roseland Ballroom, north of downtown Taunton. The original format is believed to have been all local programming. This meant that WPEP was required to cease transmitting from sunset to sunrise. WPEP's transmitter site was 760 County Street in Taunton, Massachusetts.

1970s
News Director at the time was John P. Shaw.

1980s
Daytime-only status lasted until September 1, 1986 when WPEP was granted nighttime authorization, which allowed WPEP to transmit  of power.

1990s

2000s
This would be the final calendar decade of WPEP's existence. After Giammarco left, staffer A.J. Nicholson was promoted to general manager.

In , WPEP added the Boston Red Sox Radio Network and carried the team's first World Series victory heard on radio. A May 5, 2005 article in the Taunton Daily Gazette said that the station was in jeopardy because WNSH in Beverly, Massachusetts got approval from the Federal Communications Commission (FCC) to increase their daytime power. WNSH was owned by former WPEP owner J. Keating Wilcox. When Wilcox sold WPEP to Anastos Media, there was an informal agreement that Anastos Media would turn in the station's license to allow WNSH (on the same frequency) to up their power, contingent on the power increase being granted by the FCC. The city's mayor and U.S. Representative filed objections; however, the station's general manager at the time publicly dismissed the possibility the station may go dark. On December 5, 2005, Anastos Media filed a renewal of the WPEP license. The renewal was granted by the FCC on March 28, 2006. WPEP's license was turned in to the FCC on October 18, 2007.

Auxiliary licenses
KRN297: a Remote pickup unit (RPU) on /.

Status
Station license deleted.

See also
Taunton, Massachusetts

References

External links
 (via Internet Archive)

Mass media in Bristol County, Massachusetts
Greater Taunton Area
PEP
Taunton, Massachusetts
Defunct radio stations in the United States
Radio stations established in 1949
Radio stations disestablished in 2007
Defunct companies based in Massachusetts
PEP
1949 establishments in Massachusetts
2007 disestablishments in Massachusetts